Kyle Muntz (born July 18, 1990) is an American novelist.

He is the author of five novels: Voices [2010, Enigmatic Ink], Sunshine in the Valley [2011, Civil Coping Mechanisms], VII (or) The Life, Times and Tragedy of Sir Edward William Locke the Third: Gentleman [2012, Enigmatic Ink], Green Lights [2014, CCM], and Scary People [2015, Eraserhead Press].

Excerpts and other pieces of his have also been published in Gone Lawn, Step Chamber, The Journal of Experimental Fiction and Fiction International.

His work incorporates elements of science fiction and fantasy along with elements of the avant-garde. He is interested in the literature of aesthetic and ideas. He is a game designer and writer for the character driven RPG, The Pale City.

External links
Interview with Calliope Nerve
Interview with Experimental Fiction / Poetry
Review of Sunshine in the Valley
Review of Voices
Interview at Literary Orphans
Green Lights

21st-century American novelists
American male novelists
Postmodern writers
Novelists from Michigan
1990 births
Living people
21st-century American male writers